Grabowo is a part and historical municipal neighbourhood of the City of Szczecin. It was merged with another historical neighbourhood (Drzetowo) and has formed present Drzetowo-Grabowo neighbourhood

History 
Before 1945 when Szczecin (Stettin) was a part of Germany, the German name of this suburb was Stettin-Grabow.

References 

Grabowo